Dormer or Dörmer is a surname. Notable people with the surname include:

 Albert George Dormer (1925–2014), English bridge player, writer and administrator
 Daisy Dormer (born Kezia Beatrice Stockwell; 1883–1947), British music hall performer
 Francis Joseph Dormer (1854–1928), South African journalist and newspaper editor
 Heinz Dörmer (1912–2001), German man who was imprisoned by the Nazis for homosexuality
 Sir Michael Dormer (died 1545), Lord Mayor of London
 Michael Dormer (1937–2021), New Zealand cricketer
 Michael Henry Dashwood Dormer (1935–2012), American fine artist, writer, songwriter, and entrepreneur
 Natalie Dormer (born 1982), British actress
 Richard Dormer (born 1969), Northern Irish actor, playwright and screenwriter
 Robert Dormer, 1st Baron Dormer (1551–1616), English peer
 Robert Dormer, 1st Earl of Carnarvon (1610–1643), English peer
 Sir William Dormer (bef. 1514–1575), Tudor politician

See also
 Dormer
 Dorman
 Dorner (surname)